Qutb al-Din Mawdud (died 6 September 1170) was the Zengid Emir of Mosul from  1149 to 1169. He was the son of Imad al-Din Zengi and brother and successor of Sayf al-Din Ghazi I.

Biography
At the death of Zengi, his possessions were divided between his sons: Nur al-Din received Aleppo and Saif al-Din Ghazi Mosul, while Qutb al-Din Mawdud received the emirate of Homs. After the death of Saif al-Din Ghazi in 1149, Qutb al-Din Mawdud was the first to arrive in Mosul and have himself recognized as emir; Nur al-Din, who desired to add the city to his lands, occupied Homs and Sinjar, preparing to attack his brother. Only the intervention of veterans of the Aleppo army, who refused to take part in the fratricide war which would weaken the effort against the Crusaders and the emirate of Damascus, forced Nur al-Din to renounce to the expedition and to reconcile with his brother.

During his reign in Mosul, Qutb held the Seljuq prince, Suleiman-Shah b. Muhammad b. Malik Shah, as a prisoner until 1160. In 1164, Shirkuh, a general of Nur al-Din, fought King Amalric I of Jerusalem for the control of Egypt. When he found himself in a weak situation, Nur al-Din launched an expedition against the Principality of Antioch to divert the Christian forces. The Artuqid emirs of Mardin and Diyarbakır, as well as Mawdud, joined him in the attack, which turned to be successful: the towns of Harim and Banias were captured, and Amalric had to abandon Egypt. For the same reason, Mawdud helped his brother in the County of Tripoli in 1167.

At the beginning of 1168, Kara Arslan, the Artuqid emir of Hasankeyf, died, and Qutb al-Din Mawdud tried to conquer that city; but he was pushed back by Nur al-Din, who had promised to defend Arslan's successors. 

Qutb al-Din Mawdud died in September 1170. He had designed as successor his second son Sayf al-Din Ghazi II.

Notes

See also 
 Zengid dynasty

Sources

1170 deaths
Zengid emirs of Mosul
Year of birth unknown
12th-century monarchs in the Middle East